"I'm Your Man" is a song by singer-songwriter Barry Manilow, released as a single on RCA Records in July 1986. It peaked on the Billboard Hot 100 at number 86. The music video was produced and edited by the New York DJ/VJ Scott Blackwell and was a favorite on the video show Night Flight at the time.

Track listing 
Side A
 "I'm Your Man" (Club Mix) 6:10

Side B
 "I'm Your Man" (Dub Mix) 6:25

References

Barry Manilow songs
1985 songs
1986 singles
Songs written by Barry Manilow
RCA Records singles